Australia's National Railway Museum is the largest railway museum in Australia. More than 100 major exhibits, mainly from the South Australian Railways (SAR) and Commonwealth Railways and their successor, Australian National, are on display at its  site in Port Adelaide, South Australia. The museum opened at Lipson Street in 1988 after 18 years at the SAR's former main locomotive depot at Mile End.

History

Mile End, 1964–1988
In 1963, a group of rail preservationists asked the South Australian Railways Commissioner to allocate land on the site of the former Mile End roundhouse to hold a small collection of withdrawn steam locomotives. The first locomotive arrived in 1964 and in 1970 the site opened as the Mile End Railway Museum. Only a few exhibits were under cover and the effects of weather took their toll; an alternative, under-cover venue was sought.

Move to Port Adelaide
In 1987, the Mile End Railway Museum obtained a $2 million Australia's Bicentennial commemorative grant to redevelop the former Port Dock goods terminal as the new property. In January 1988, the museum closed at Mile End and 11 months later opened as the Port Dock Station Railway Museum.

In 1999, funding was received as part of Australia's Centenary of Federation to construct a Commonwealth Railway Museum within the museum's precinct. The facility, opened in 2001, houses a representative sample of exhibits from the Commonwealth Railways and its successor, the Australian National Railways Commission, later named Australian National. Included are vehicles from The Ghan, Tea and Sugar and Trans-Australian trains. At the opening, the museum was renamed the National Railway Museum on the initiative of deputy prime minister and noted railway enthusiast, Tim Fischer, AC.

In May 2009, the main pavilion was named after Ron Fitch, who as South Australian Railways Commissioner had facilitated the transfer of much of the museum's early rolling stock. At the same time, the Commonwealth Railways Museum was renamed the Ronald E. Fluck Pavilion, after the museum's founder.

In 2017, $16.4 million was allocated in the state budget for a new station to be built next to Baker Street, near the original site of the Port Dock railway station. It was to be at the end of a new 1.0 km (1100 yard) spur line using the existing corridor beside the museum that connects to the Outer Harbor railway line. However, in June 2019 when some museum track had already been dismantled, the development was paused while a North West Planning Study was conducted; a forecast cost increase to $40 million was cited. On-ground preparatory work was reversed in January 2020.

Collection

The museum houses its large static collection in two pavilions and the historic Port Dock railway station goods shed. On the site, all three mainline gauges of Australia are represented: narrow, ; standard, ; and broad . The collection comprises more than 100 major exhibits, mainly from the Commonwealth Railways and South Australian Railways. It also holds rolling stock from the Silverton Tramway and Victorian Railways.

Operational locomotives and railcars on these gauges are:
narrow gauge: former Broken Hill Associated Smelters steam locomotive Peronne (1918 Andrew Barclay 0-6-0T tank locomotive)
broad gauge: former SAR diesel-electric locomotives 515 and 801, "Red Hen" railcars 321 and 400, and "Bluebird" railcar 257. 
The museum also operates locomotives, including steam locomotives Bill (with a 2-4-0 wheel arrangement) and Bub (0-4-2T), for visitor rides on its  track around the site.

Locomotive and railcar exhibits 

Steam locomotives
 SAR Rx 93
 SAR Y 97
 SAR P 117
 SAR T 253
 SAR F 255
 SAR 409
 SAR 504 Tom Barr Smith
 SAR 523 Essington Lewis
 SAR 624
 SAR 702
 SAR (ex VR) 752
 CR G 1
 CR NM 34
 Silverton Tramway Y 12
 Silverton Tramway A 21
 Silverton Tramway W 25
 Broken Hill Associated Smelters Peronne ←(operational)
 BHP Whyalla no. 4

Diesel locomotives
 SAR diesel shunter 515 & 517 ←(no. 515 is operational)
 SAR mainline diesel 703 ←(static, to be operational)
 SAR diesel shunter 801 ←(operational)
 SAR mainline diesel 900
 SAR mainline diesel 930
 CR GM class GM 2
 CR mainline diesel NSU 61
 CR diesel shunter DE 91

Railcars
 SAR Model 55 Brill railcar 8
 SAR Model 75 Brill railcar 41
 SAR Bluebird railcar 257 Kestrel ←(operational)
 SAR Redhen railcars 321 and 400 ←(operational)
 STA 2000 class railcars 2006 and 2112
 CR Budd Railcar CB 1

Operations

The museum operates a number of historic locomotives for shunting of rolling stock and during special events. In 1992, the museum, in cooperation with the local council, built a  line along the beach from Semaphore to Fort Glanville. From October to April, trains operate – subject to temperatures being less than  – on weekends, public holidays and school holidays. The line travels along the coastline, through the sand dunes and the Fort Glanville Conservation Park; the locomotive is turned at each end.

Since 1982 the museum has published its bi-monthly Catch Point Magazine, a full-colour, A5-format, 48-page magazine that features news and articles about railway operations mainly in South Australia.

Buildings
The museum has a number of historic buildings, some original to the site and others transported for display, including the following:
Port Dock station goods shed: this is the only remaining intact building of the Port Adelaide (later named Port Dock) station complex. Typical of South Australian Railways structures of the 19th century, architecturally it is an austere industrial building notable for its scale and the use of large timber beams throughout. Its size and scale reflect the economic prosperity of South Australia when it was built, in 1878 – a time when Port Adelaide's facilities were being extended to serve the growing import and export trade. It has been entered in the SA Heritage Register.  
Woodville signal cabin: this two-storey wooden building from suburban Woodville, prominently backing on to Lipson Street, is connected to the narrow gauge yard.

Gallery

Notes

See also 
List of railway museums

References

Bibliography

External links
 Official Website

Museums in Adelaide
National railway museums
Railway museums in South Australia
1963 establishments in Australia